Stop Us If You've Heard This One Before is a compilation album by Barenaked Ladies which includes rare recordings dating between 1992 and 2003. The album was originally planned as a companion to Hits from Yesterday & the Day Before; however, the release was pushed back to 8 May 2012, making it a standalone release. The 12-track album  contains ten never-before-released tracks, as well as two previously released rarities. The album was released by Rhino Records

Album contents
Stop Us If You've Heard This One Before contains 12 songs spanning 1992 to 2003. It contains four final studio recordings (B-sides not included on albums), three live recordings, three demos, an "outtake" and a remix.

Two tracks ("One Week" (Pull's Break Remix) and "Yes! Yes!! Yes!!!") were previously released as B-sides on singles. "I Don't Get It Anymore" is the only final studio recording included for which the song was not later re-recorded and released on an album. "Second Best" appears on Everything To Everyone, and "Adrift", "Half A Heart" and "I Can, I Will, I Do" were subsequently re-recorded for Barenaked Ladies Are Me/Men.

Much of the material on Stop Us If You've Heard This One Before dates to the band's Reprise period. Four tracks come from 2003's Everything to Everyone, two more come from the sessions for 2001's Disc One: All Their Greatest Hits (1991-2001), and one track comes from the sessions of 2000's "Maroon". The remaining tracks include three live recordings from 1992 to 1994, a demo of The Old Apartment and "One Week" (Pull's Break Remix).

Early live recordings include "Same Thing"  (1992),  "Teenage Wasteland" (1993), and "Shake Your Rump" (1994), a cover of a Beastie Boys song.

Track listing

Tracks 2, 7 – previously released, alternate versions of Tracks 3, 10, 11, and 12 are previously released
Track 2 – originally released as a B-side on the UK single of "Celebrity".
Track 7 – originally released on 12" vinyl, along with three other mixes of the song.
Tracks 1, 11 – recorded during Disc One: All Their Greatest Hits (1991–2001) sessions in 2001.
 Tracks 2, 9, 10, 12 – recorded during the Everything to Everyone sessions from 2002–2003.
 Track 3 – recorded during Maroon sessions in 2000.

Personnel

Barenaked Ladies
Steven Page – vocals, guitar
Ed Robertson – vocals, guitar
Jim Creeggan – bass, vocals
Tyler Stewart – drums, percussion, vocals
Kevin Hearn – keyboards, piano, vocals
Andy Creeggan – keyboards, piano, vocals (Tracks 5, 6 and 8)

Production
Art Direction: Chris Billheimer
Band Management: Jordan Feldstein, Rich Egan (CAM8)
Mastering/Mixing: Brad Blackwood
Project Assistance: Mike Engstrom, Linzi Schall, Erin Solis, Manson Williams, Steve Woolard

References

Barenaked Ladies albums
Reprise Records compilation albums
2012 compilation albums
B-side compilation albums